Goebeliellaceae is a family of liverworts belonging to the order Porellales. The family consists of only one genus: Goebeliella Steph..

The genus name of Goebeliella is in honour of Karl von Goebel (1855–1932), who was a German botanist.

The genus was circumscribed by Franz Stephani in Hedwigia Vol.51 on page 61 in 1911.

References

Porellales
Liverwort genera